Tooth and Nail may refer to:

Music
 Tooth & Nail (Billy Bragg album), 2013
 Tooth and Nail (Dokken album) or the title song, 1984
 Tooth and Nail (various artists album), featuring California punk bands, 1979
 Tooth & Nail Records, an American record label
 T&N, originally Tooth and Nail, an American rock band
 "Tooth and Nail", a song by Foreigner from Agent Provocateur, 1984

Other uses
 Tooth and Nail (film), a 2007 horror film
 Tooth and Nail (novel), a 1992 novel by Ian Rankin
 Tooth and nail syndrome, a medical disorder

See also
 The Tooth and the Nail, a 2017 South Korean film